Acromag, Inc. manufactures embedded computing, process instrumentation, and distributed I/O products.

Established in 1957, Acromag built its reputation designing critical measurement instrumentation equipment for the petrochemical and aerospace industries. It now designs analog and digital control products for the industrial I/O and defense markets.

Acromag's experience in designing industrial I/O has paved the way for solutions to ground loops, RFI/EMI noise, and temperature drift. Many products are available with agency approvals such as UL, cUL, FM, CSA, CE, ATEX, and others to assure precise operation in hostile environments.

The company has three product divisions: Embedded Computing Solutions, Process Control and Automation Solutions and Contract Manufacturing Services. Its product lines focus on manufacturing, military, scientific, public utility, and transportation applications.

History
Acromag's history began in 1957 with Henry Patton, a pioneer in the development of solid-state magnetic amplifiers. Expanding from its first location in Detroit, Michigan, (now Southfield), Acromag headquarters currently reside in Wixom, Michigan.

It acquired Xembedded, LLC (formerly XycomVME) in 2012.

Process Instrumentation and Embedded Board Innovations
1960s  Designed and manufactured temperature transmitters and thermo-electric metal testers
1970s  Rack-mount I/O systems and field-mount transmitters
1980s  Remote data acquisition systems; Exorbus and VMEbus I/O boards
1990s  μP-based signal conditioners; Industry Pack modules and carrier cards
2000s  Distributed I/O; PMC modules, PCI and CompactPCI I/O boards, reconfigurable FPGA modules
2010s  USB-configured instruments; XMC modules, VPX boards, industrial PCs
2016  Offer contract manufacturing services

References

Technology companies established in 1957
Engineering companies of the United States
1957 establishments in Michigan
Companies based in Oakland County, Michigan